Béla Kovács may refer to:

Béla Kovács (clarinetist) (1937-2021), Hungarian clarinetist
Béla Kovács (communist) (1910–1980), Hungarian politician and jurist, Minister of Justice, 1953–1954
Béla Kovács (footballer) (born 1977), Hungarian football player
Béla Kovács (politician, 1908) (1908–1959), Hungarian politician, Minister of Agriculture, 1945–1946
Béla Kovács (politician, 1960) (born 1960), Hungarian politician and Member of the European Parliament
Béla Turi-Kovács, (born 1935), Hungarian politician